Robert Ashton may refer to:

Robert de Ashton (died 1385), military commander under Edward III of England
Robert Ashton (historian) (1924–2013), British historian
Robert Ashton (photographer) (born 1950), Australian photographer and photojournalist
Robert C. Ashton (died 2017), American cardiac and thoracic surgeon
Robert Ashton, character in The Gentleman from Nowhere

See also
Robert Aston (born 1978), American rapper, known as Skinhead Rob